1510 Charlois, provisional designation , is a carbonaceous Eunomia asteroid from the middle region of the asteroid belt, approximately 24 kilometers in diameter.

It was discovered on 22 February 1939, by French astronomer André Patry at Nice Observatory in southeastern France, and later named after astronomer Auguste Charlois.

Orbit and classification 

Charlois is a carbonaceous C-type asteroid and a member of the Eunomia family, a large group of otherwise mostly S-type asteroids and the most prominent family in the intermediate main-belt. It orbits the Sun in the central main-belt at a distance of 2.3–3.1 AU once every 4 years and 4 months (1,595 days). Its orbit has an eccentricity of 0.15 and an inclination of 12° with respect to the ecliptic.
As no precoveries were taken and no prior identifications were made, the body's observation arc begins with its discovery observation in 1939.

Physical characteristics

Diameter and albedo 

According to the surveys carried out by the Infrared Astronomical Satellite IRAS, the Japanese Akari satellite, and NASA's Wide-field Infrared Survey Explorer with its subsequent NEOWISE mission, Charlois measures between 20.3 and 27.6 kilometers in diameter, and its surface has an albedo between 0.077 and 0.12, while the Collaborative Asteroid Lightcurve Link derives an albedo of 0.079 and a diameter of 23.7 kilometers based on an absolute magnitude of 11.5.

Rotation period 

In November 2007, a rotational lightcurve, constructed from photometric observations by Crag Bennefeld at the Rick Observatory, gave a rotation period of  hours with a brightness variation of 0.23 in magnitude. Another lightcurve, obtained by French astronomers Pierre Antonini and René Roy in February 2013, gave a period of  hours with an amplitude of 0.18.

Naming 

This minor planet was named in memory of French astronomer Auguste Charlois (1864–1910), an early discoverer of minor planets at the Nice Observatory where this asteroid was discovered. He was a pioneer during the transition from visual to photographic discoveries in the late 19th century. Until his homicide in 1910, he had discovered 99 asteroids. The official  was published by the Minor Planet Center on 30 June 1977.

References

External links 
 Asteroid Lightcurve Database (LCDB), query form (info )
 Dictionary of Minor Planet Names, Google books
 Asteroids and comets rotation curves, CdR – Observatoire de Genève, Raoul Behrend
 Discovery Circumstances: Numbered Minor Planets (1)-(5000) – Minor Planet Center
 
 

Eunomia asteroids
Charlois
Charlois
C-type asteroids (SMASS)
19390222